Ghanaians in Germany are Ghanaian immigrants in Germany and their descendants living and working in Germany. Ghanaians in Germany are said to form the second largest of the country’s diaspora populations in Europe, after the United Kingdom.

History 
Even before Ghana's independence in 1957, there has been a relationship between Ghana and Germany.  The Volta Region of Ghana was part of the German colony of Togo before World War I. In 1957, 44 Ghanaian students were registered in West German universities through a policy that allowed Africans to build skills in German universities. In the 1960s and 70s, most of the Ghanaian migrants to Germany were education migrants. They formed local associations in the university towns and cities in Germany, which in turn became the Union of Ghanaian Students in Germany (UGSG).

In 2009, according to Deutsche Gesellschaft fur Technische Zusammenarbeit (GTZ), there were about 40,000 'Ghanaians with a migration background' in Germany; where 'Ghanaians with a migration background' means 'naturalised persons of Ghanaian origin' and 'the second and third generation of Ghanaians naturalised in Germany and the children from binational partnerships who did not immigrate on their own'.

Almost 9,729 children were born to German-Ghanaian couples between 1965 and 2006. In 2007, 20,329 persons with Ghanaian citizenship were officially registered in Germany, 8,194 Ghanaian citizens became German citizens between 1980 and 2007.

Currently, Ghana maintains good relations with Germany and there is a large Ghanaian community in Germany, many of whom go there for educational migration, asylum-seeking migration and family reunification.

Distribution 
Ghanaians in Germany mostly live in the metropolises of Hamburg, Berlin and Bremen, the Ruhr region, and the Frankfurt/Main metropolitan area. 22.7% of Ghanaian migrants, the highest percentage, live in the city of Hamburg. Also, 23.8% of the Ghanaians living in Germany live in North Rhine-Westphalia. 9.2% of Ghanaian citizens in Germany live in Berlin. 9.8% live in the federal state of Hesse. There has been a long tradition of  Ghanaians migrating to Hamburg, hence the concentration of Ghanaians there. In Ghana, the word ‘booga’ or ‘burger’, used to refer to migrants, has roots in the name ‘Hamburg’.

Associations 
In June 2004, through an initiative of the Ghanaian Embassy in Germany, the Union of Ghanaian Associations in Germany (UGAG) was formed to include all Ghanaian associations in Germany. The first attempt in 1996 had failed. Church communities are among the most influential formations as Christianity is the largest religion in Ghana. The Church of Pentecost Germany, Ghana Catholic Mission-Hamburg, the Bethel Church-Stuttgart and the Presbyterian Church of Cologne are the best-known Ghanaian churches in Germany.

Remittances 
Ghana is now one of the top recipients of remittances from its global diaspora. Private remittances make up over one-sixth of the country's gross domestic product. In a survey, 90% of Ghanaians transfer money to Ghana for their families. Some even send more than half their income and go into debt.

Culture

Music 

From the late 1970s to the early 1980s, a genre of music came up in Germany and Ghana called Burger Highlife – fusion of highlife, and funk music styles. Ghanaian immigrants in Germany created it.

Living in Germany

Education 
For Ghanaians hoping to study in Germany, the West African Secondary School Certificate Examination (WASSCE) can't be used for direct entry into a German university as it would be used in Ghana. A student has to complete one year of tertiary education in Ghana or complete a one-year preparatory course (Studienkolleg) in Germany. Also, there are no HND top-up courses in Germany. Ghanaians would have to apply for the Bachelor's degree in a university of applied sciences.

Other aspects of living and working 
Ghanaians migrants and visitors like other nationalities have to book a hotel for short stays or rent or buy a home for a more extended stay. Learning the German language is required for professions like nursing and healthcare. Ghanaians that start their own businesses in Germany, like everyone else, need to register with the trade office if they are self employed or the tax office if they want to work as freelancers.

External links 

 Meet the Germans: What does a Ghanaian think about Germany? – Deutsche Welle

References 

Germany
African diaspora in Germany